Eulogio Aranguren Labairu (27 July 1892 – 19 October 1972) was an Argentine footballer who spent his youth in Basque Country. He was a midfielder and played most of his career for Real Madrid CF. He was the elder brother of Sotero Aranguren who was also his teammate at Real Madrid.

Biography
He played for Real Madrid for 10 years, between 1911 and 1921. In this period he made 20 appearances but failed to score in official games, as he played mostly as defender.

Three years after the premature death of his brother, Eulogio (together with King Alfonso XIII and a sister of Machimbarrena, the captain of Real Madrid who also died in the same period) inaugurated a statue to the two players at the entrance of the first team's locker room. This statue is seen as a talisman for club's next generations of footballers.

In 1925 he founded the Real Madrid rugby team, he was also a referee and after that became president of the Castile Referee Federation.

He also was vice-president of the Spanish Football Federation, and on several occasions joined the Spain national football team as an official. He studied to become a lawyer. He had 5 children, Jose Eulogio (Josechu), Maruchi, Fernando, Sotero (died in infancy) and Ignacio.

Together with his brother, the Arangurens were the inaugural Argentine born footballers to play for Real Madrid.

Honours
Real Madrid CF
Copa del Rey: 1917
Campeonato Regional Centro: 1912-13, 1915–16, 1916–17

External links 
 Eulogio's biography at Real Madrid official website (Spanish)

References

1892 births
1973 deaths
Footballers from Buenos Aires
Argentine footballers
Spanish footballers
Real Madrid CF players
Association football midfielders
Footballers from the Basque Country (autonomous community)
Argentine people of Basque descent